Aechmea correia-araujoi is a species of flowering plant in the genus Aechmea. This species is endemic to the State of Bahia in eastern Brazil.

Cultivars
 Aechmea 'Haiku'

References

External links

correia-araujoi
Flora of Brazil
Plants described in 1980